John Turner (1800–1883) of Bradford and Harrogate in Yorkshire, England, was a draper, landlord, and moneylender, whose perceived behaviour led to his reputation as a miser. 

By dint of excessively hard work, long hours, and self-denial, this smallholder's son rose from the position of a draper's assistant via well-to-do shop-owner, to become a rich property-owner and sought-after lender to the moneyed residents and visitors of Harrogate. However, his extreme and pecunious personal habits drew the attention of local people, who saw him pay in full for buildings and land, but deny himself and his family the comforts of life, and hoard and recycle waste material to make pennies, alongside the great profits he made in his primary occupations.

After Turner's death his biography, comparing him to the miser Daniel Dancer, was printed and copied in the Press, and around the same time his life - and perhaps his legacy - was celebrated with an expensive stone memorial, in Grove Road Cemetery, Harrogate..

Background
John Turner was born on 1 March 1800 in Ripon, North Riding of Yorkshire, into a family of smallholders "who by dint of thrift and hard work had acquired money".

Turner moved to Starbeck around 1840, and had a son John Frances Turner Vant (24 June 1840 – 27 November 1882),  with Jane Vant (1813 – 15 March 1887) from Ripon, who was possibly his housekeeper, and the child was born in Ripon. In 1841 Turner married Jane Vant. When married, he kept his annual household costs below £20 . The Knaresborough Post describes his home life:

Fire was never used in [Turner's] house except for cooking, and when he could not pick up coal sufficient to supply that requirement he went out into the hedgerows for timber. On returning home from his errands he always divested himself of the suit with which he went abroad, and donned a home suit composed of hundreds of patches of all sizes of material from about  square.

However, Turner's eccentricity was not hidden. He bought the half-built house next door from a builder who ran out of money, and he or his son lived there without completing the build, with "a great mound of stones and rubbish remaining in front which on no account would he have disturbed".

The 1851 and 1861 Censuses find Turner and his wife and son living in Beech Cottage, next to Starbeck railway station, and he is describing himself as a "house and land proprietor". By 1871 Turner is calling his cottage "Beech Villa", and describing himself as a retired draper. In 1881, the Census finds Turner, aged 81, boarding (not visiting) in a lodging house at 5 Promenade Square, in the parish of St Mary's in Low Harrogate. Meanwhile his wife Jane was still living in Beech Villa, calling herself a "house and land proprietor's wife".

Career

Bradford

Turner served his draper's apprenticeship at an unknown location, and then in 1827 became a linen draper's assistant at John Sayer's shop, next to the Old Bowling Green Inn, Bradford, and also at Sayer's shop at Keighley. in the West Riding of Yorkshire. While working for Sayer, Turner "was one of the swells of the period, and took great pride in adorning himself with rings, gold guards, and jewellery, having in this respect higher aspirations than drapers' assistants usually entertain".

Sayer found the Bradford shop unprofitable, and he was already trying to let it in 1827, so around 1831 he offered it to Turner, and Turner started business with an advance of £1000 on the security of an expected inheritance from his family - and his appearance and demeanour changed at once. He sold all his jewellery, apart from his watch and gold guard, which he hid away. "He was never afterward seen to wear a vestige of anything except the most needful apparel". He earned, but did not spend, willingly; "he literally carried his life in his hands in order to achieve success". He and his apprentices worked long hours, opening the shop between four and six in the morning, well before his neighbours opened theirs, and closing between ten and twelve in the evening. Passing coachmen who changed horses behind the Bowling Green Inn would sometimes spot Turner still working at one hour past midnight. Turner drove himself hard to keep the shop "packed from basement to attic" with stock, and he would sleep for perhaps a few hours per night among those goods. 

Smith did not share his fortune with others. He did not marry early in his career. He had a housekeeper, and a pair of apprentices under contract, for whom premiums were paid to him by their sponsors. He economised on transport costs by walking everywhere, including those occasions when he had to travel between Bradford and Manchester to purchase stock, the beeline distance being . He "occasionally got a lift in a carrier's wagon, but whether he paid for the ride is doubtful, as parting with money was with him one of the unpardonable sins". He took advantage of independent cottage weavers, too. The Knaresborough Post describes his modus operandi: 

In the days when little makers were numerous, and not so well off as perhaps operatives are nowadays, it was the custom for manufacturers to be their own weavers and their own salesmen, travelling the country with the produce of their wooden looms on their backs or on the backs of packhorses or asses. Turner, knowing from experience the chronic impecuniosity of many of these men, waited until they had travelled the country unsuccessfully with their webs, and then, rather than return home empty-handed, they accepted prices from him which meant privation for many days to come.

Besides extreme hard work and frugality, Turner needed to make money out of his savings. He did this by investment, and his first such venture was made about two years after going into business. by buying the deeds of a pub in Bradford. However, paying the whole purchase price upfront brought public attention to his hidden wealth for the first time, because until that moment he had given the appearance of poverty. It was at that point that his reputation as a miser began.

Turner's draper's shop continued to open for long hours and it did well, but he became ill, and around 1840, nine years after starting in business, he sold the shop, which fetched a good price, being known to be a prospering business. With the sale of the shop and his savings, he had accrued £16,000.

Starbeck

Around 1840, for the sake of his health, Turner migrated from industrial Bradford to Beech Cottage, also known as Beech Villa or Beech Grove House, in  Starbeck near the spa town of Harrogate, in the North Riding of Yorkshire. The house was near the North Eastern Railway line. He regained his health and became a moneylender to the people of Harrogate. This was a fortuitous step, because when he arrived, Harrogate consisted of two small villages, but as its fame  and size grew and businesses moved in, it filled with rich residents and visitors, and he drew from these as his customer base. As a moneylender, he was "sought after by persons who were in financial embarrassment ... Tradesmen in their winter difficulties, property-owners with deeds to mortgage, sought him without ceasing". Turner was "never known to be entangled in a lawsuit". He always charged the same rate of five per cent for loans, he held pledges, and pledges were redeemed. He was now in good health, and secure in his business, but his behaviour continued to draw attention, as it had in Bradford: The Knaresborough Post somewhat dramatises the story:

Here, secluded in his own house, in the privacy of his own grounds, with re-established health, did the Bradford draper accumulate with greater eagerness than before. Nothing that would realise money escaped his cold grey eyes. Belated travellers and those up betimes encountered him on the highways gathering the refuse of the roads on his wheelbarrow, or picking up stones on the roadside, which, after being broken in sufficient quantities, he would dispose of as road metal. Having on one occasion a debtor at Ripon who was unable to repay him, he took as a security on account a grindstone. Unlimbering it from the frame, he wheeled the stone before him to Starbeck, but unhappily, when within a short distance from his home, it broke in two, and there lay, until he returned with his wheelbarrow for the fragments. The ever present companion of his daily journeys was a dark blue moreen bag, which a friendly lawyer may have discarded, and without which he was rarely seen abroad. No trifle was too inconsiderable to find a home within it; even a stray feather from a fowl by the wayside would be carefully picked up and added to the stock previously gathered. Bits of old iron, stray nails, bags of woollen, cotton, or linen were commodities much too valuable to be left behind. Old boots, shoes and bits of leather were pounced upon and disposed of for what they would realise at the hands of some economical cobbler, or when too valueless for his uses they were hoarded yet a little longer until the whole could be profitably disposed of to the manufacturer of glue.

Turner had tenants in Bradford. He walked from Starbeck with a  pre-packed lunch to collect rent, and was once seen walking barefoot across Rombalds Moor, carrying his shoes to "save leather". He was a landlord who never missed the dates when rents were due, and tenants were served a distraint order as soon as they defaulted. Turner did see fit to pay a solicitor, though. In 1875 he paid solicitors Kirby & Son of Harrogate to present a petition for the bankruptcy of the whitesmith, ironmonger and alleged forger William Leek of Harrogate. Leek owed money to Turner, "filed a petition for liquidation of his affairs by arrangement", then absconded, saying he was "going to America". Leek was declared bankrupt on Turner's petition, but as of January 1875 the police were still looking for him.

Death

By the end of Turner's life, he had become a well-known character in Harrogate and Starbeck, and was a landlord who held a lot of land and property in the vicinity of Harrogate, being described as a "large owner of property" in 1882. He died in Harrogate, "after a long and protracted illness", on 2 March 1883 aged 83 years. 

Turner's funeral was held on 8 March 1883. At midday the funeral procession left the Crown Hotel, Harrogate, with seven coaches containing relatives and tenants following the coffin. The funeral service was conducted at Christ Church, High Harrogate, by Reverend C.J. Hamar, after which he was buried at Grove Road Cemetery.

At Turner's death, there was much public speculation on the subject of Turner's worth. His will was proved on 12 April 1883 at the Principal Registry, although a double probate was issued in November 1887 or 1889. In April 1883 his personal estate was calculated as £50,784, 15s 10d.

In 1884, as part of a retrospective of the previous year, The Knaresborough Post printed the following obituary of Turner:

... [a] figure closely associated with early Harrogate, the late John Turner, of Starbeck. The penurious habits of this individual are well known, and perhaps to some extent he merited the title given him by a Bradford contemporary – miser; but though charity was a quality foreign to his nature, his sense of justice, on the other hand, was so acute, that we believe he was easier satisfied upon the question of per cent, than has been many a man more generally credited with charitable proclivities.

Aftermath
During the forty years after Turner began to earn his fortune, one of his former Bradford apprentices did very well, behaving somewhat unlike his former master Turner.  That lad "amassed a handsome fortune in a neighbouring county [and lived] honoured and respected as a public benefactor".

Soon after Turner died, his biography by a "Bradford contemporary", in which he was titled "Harrogate miser" and compared to Daniel Dancer, was printed in detail in the The Bradford Observer, and repeated in two of Robert Ackrill's newspapers, The Knaresborough Post and ''The Pateley Bridge & Nidderdale Herald.

See also
 Daniel Dancer

Notes

References

External links

1800 births
1883 deaths
People from Harrogate
British businesspeople
Misers